Provost may refer to:

People
 Provost (name), a surname

Officials

Government
 Provost (civil), an officer of local government, including the equivalent of a mayor in Scotland
 Lord provost, the equivalent of a lord mayor in Scotland

Military
 Provost (military police), military police responsible for policing within the armed forces
 Provost marshal, an officer in charge of military police
 Provost Marshal General, commander of the military police in the United States
 Provost sergeant, a sergeant in charge of regimental police in Commonwealth armies

Religion
 Provost (religion), a high-ranking church official
 Prince-provost, a high-ranking church official

Other fields
 Provost (education), a senior academic administrator within certain higher education institutions 
 Provost (martial arts), a ranking that was second only to master in Renaissance England

Aircraft
 BAC Jet Provost, a British training aircraft
 Percival Provost, British training aircraft

Geography
 Municipal District of Provost No. 52, a municipal district in Alberta, Canada
 Provost, Alberta, a town in Alberta, Canada
 Provost Airport
 Provost, Virginia, a village in Powhatan County, Virginia, United States
 Provost Avenue, Bronx, NY, the origin of New York State Route 22 
 Stour Provost, a village in Dorset, England

Other uses
 Arthur Provost Three-Decker, a historic building in Massachusetts, United States
 Provost Academy South Carolina, a virtual public charter school in South Carolina, United States

See also
 Provo (disambiguation)
 Prévôt, the French term